Benthofascis sarcinula is a species of sea snail, a marine gastropod mollusk in the family Conorbidae.

These snails are predatory and venomous. They are capable of "stinging" humans, therefore live ones should be handled carefully or not at all.

Description
The length of an adult shell varies between 16.6 mm and 24.7 mm. The diameter varies between 7.4 mm and 10.7 mm.

(Original description) The solid shell is small and has an ovate-fusiform shape. Its colour is pale yellow, with a rusty tinge at the suture. The shell contains 3½ whorls, including a protoconch of 1½ whorl. The protoconch shows fine spiral grooves, continued on the adult as broad, shallow furrows, which are broadest at the suture becoming smaller and closer anteriorly. On the body whorl are twenty-two spiral ribs, on the penultimate whorl six. The latter are latticed by fine radial riblets. The whole shell is crossed by fine, arcuate growth lines. The aperture is narrow. The sinus is deep. The outer lip is thin, straight, produced medially, edge crenulated by the sculpture. No callus on the inner lip. The columella is broad and twisted. The siphonal canal is not produced.

Distribution
This marine species is endemic to Australia and occurs off New South Wales, Queensland and Tasmania.

References

 Gatliff, J.H. & Gabriel, C.J. 1922. Additions to and alterations in the Catalogue of Victorian Marine Mollusca. Proceedings of the Royal Society of Victoria n.s. 34(2): 128–161
 Hedley, C. 1922. A revision of the Australian Turridae. Records of the Australian Museum 13(6): 213–359, pls 42–56
 Laseron, C. 1954. Revision of the New South Wales Turridae (Mollusca). Australian Zoological Handbook. Sydney : Royal Zoological Society of New South Wales 1–56, pls 1–12.

External links
 

sarcinula
Gastropods of Australia